José Roberto Mendoza Perdomo (born 31 May 1993) is a Mexican male volleyball player. He is part of the Mexico men's national volleyball team. On club level he plays for the Virtus Guanajuato.

References

External links
 Profile at FIVB.org
 Player profile at Volleybox.net

1993 births
Living people
Mexican men's volleyball players
Place of birth missing (living people)